Garrard Glacier is a glacier in the Queen Alexandra Range of Antarctica, draining eastward from the névé between Mount Lockwood and Mount Kirkpatrick and entering Beardmore Glacier south of Bell Bluff. It appears that the British Antarctic Expedition, 1910–13, applied the name "Garrard Glacier" to the feature which had been named Bingley Glacier by Ernest Shackleton in 1908. The area was surveyed by the New Zealand Geological Survey Antarctic Expedition (1961–62), who retained Bingley Glacier on the basis of priority and reapplied the name Garrard Glacier to this previously unnamed feature. The name is for Apsley Cherry-Garrard, a zoologist with the British Antarctic Expedition.

See also
Morrison Hills, a series of rugged east–west trending hills between Garrard Glacier and Hewson Glacier

References

External links

Glaciers of the Ross Dependency
Shackleton Coast